Rhinoprora oribates is a moth in the family Geometridae. It is found on Java.

The wingspan is about 26 mm. The forewings are darker and more glossy than in Rhinoprora palpata, the green shades almost suppressed except in the lines which bound the basal patch and the broad median band. The hindwings are more glossy and more smoky than in palpata. They are weakly marked.

References

Moths described in 1925
Eupitheciini